Voices of Remembrance is an outdoor 2004 art installation by Valerie Otani, installed in north Portland, Oregon's Kenton neighborhood. The work is installed at TriMet's Expo Center station along the MAX Yellow Line, which was previously the site of the 1942 Portland Assembly Center.

See also

 2004 in art

References

2004 establishments in Oregon
2004 sculptures
Gates in the United States
Japanese-American culture in Portland, Oregon
Kenton, Portland, Oregon
Outdoor sculptures in Portland, Oregon
Sculptures on the MAX Yellow Line